Belém (Portuguese for Bethlehem; initially called Nossa Senhora de Belém do Grão-Pará, in English Our Lady of Bethlehem of Great Pará) often called Belém of Pará, is a Brazilian city, capital and largest city of the state of Pará in the country's north. It is the gateway to the Amazon River with a busy port, airport, and bus/coach station. Belém lies approximately 100 km upriver from the Atlantic Ocean, on the Pará River, which is part of the greater Amazon River system, separated from the larger part of the Amazon delta by Ilha de Marajó (Marajo Island). With an estimated population of 1,499,641 people — or 2,491,052, considering its metropolitan area — it is the 11th most populous city in Brazil, as well as the 16th by economic relevance. It is the second largest in the North Region, second only to Manaus, in the state of Amazonas.

Founded in 1616 by the Kingdom of Portugal, Belém was the first European colony on the Amazon but did not become part of Brazil until 1775. The newer part of the city has modern buildings and skyscrapers. The colonial portion retains the charm of tree-filled squares, churches and traditional blue tiles. The city has a rich history and architecture from colonial times. Recently it witnessed a skyscraper boom.

Belém is also known as the Metropolis of the Brazilian Amazon region or the Cidade das Mangueiras (City of Mango Trees) due to the vast number of those trees found in the city. Brazilians often refer to the city as Belém do Pará ("Belém of Pará") rather than just Belém, a reference to an earlier name for the city, Santa Maria de Belém do Grão Pará ("Saint Mary of Bethlehem of Great Pará"), and also to differentiate it from  a number of other towns called Belém in Brazil, as well as the city of Bethlehem in the West Bank of Israel. It is named after Santa Maria de Belém in Lisbon, also better known by its shortened name, Belém.

Belém is served by Val de Cans International Airport, which connects the city with the rest of Brazil and other cities in South America, North America (United States) and Europe (Lisbon). The city is also home to the Federal University of Pará and the Pará State University.

Etymology

The name of Belém has origin in Arabic which means "the house of bread". Initially the city was called "St. Mary of Belém of Pará" or "Our Lady of Belém of Grão-Pará", eventually shortened to Belém do Pará (name given by Philip III of Spain), in reference to Christmas; the day when captain Francisco Caldeira Castelo Branco left from the city of São Luís in 1615 to conquer the lands of Pará.

History

In 1615, Portuguese captain-general Francisco Caldeira Castelo Branco of the captaincy of Bahia commanded a military expedition sent by the Governor General of Brazil to check the trading excursions of foreigners (French, Dutch, English) up the river (Amazon) from the Cabo do Norte in Grão Pará.

On January 12, 1616, he anchored in what is now known as Guajará Bay, formed by the confluence of the Para and Guamá Rivers, called by the Tupinambás, "Guaçu Paraná". Caldeira mistook the bay for the main channel, and thirty leagues (178 km) upstream, he built a wooden fort, covered with straw, which he called "Presépio" (nativity scene), now known as "Forte do Castelo". The colony formed by the fort was given the name Feliz Lusitânia, "Fortunate Lusitania". It was the embryo of the future city of Belém. The fort failed to suppress Dutch and French trading, but did ward off colonization.

Feliz Lusitânia was later called Nossa Senhora de Belém do Grão Pará (Our Lady of Bethlehem of Grao-Para) and Santa Maria de Belém (St. Mary of Bethlehem). Belém was given city status in 1655 and was made capital of the State when Pará state was split off from Maranhão in 1772. The early decades of the 19th century were marked by political instability. Uprisings and internecine strife finally ended in 1836, after considerable loss of life.

The sugar trade in the Belém region was important up to the end of the 17th century. Thereafter the city's economic importance alternately rose and fell. Cattle ranching supplanted sugar until the 18th century, when cultivation of rice, cotton and coffee became profitable. With the settlement of southern Brazil, where such crops could be produced more efficiently, Belém declined again. The city subsequently became the main exporting centre of the Amazon rubber industry, and by 1866 its position was further enhanced by the opening of the Amazon, Tocantins and Tapajós rivers to navigation. The rubber era ended after the boom of 1910–12, but Belém continued to be the main commercial centre of northern Brazil and the entrepôt for the Amazon valley.

Geography 

The municipality includes the islands of Mosqueiro, fringed by 14 freshwater beaches, and Caratateua which receive a large number of visitors in summertime. In addition to these and also near Belém, is the island of Tatuoca which is the location of one of the seven geophysical stations in the world, and the only station in Latin America.

Climate
Belém has a tropical rainforest climate (Köppen: Af) more subject to the Intertropical Convergence Zone than the maritime trade winds, and with no cyclones, that is a true equatorial climate. In all 12 months of the year, the city on average sees more than 60 mm of rainfall, so the city has no true dry season month. However, Belém features noticeably wetter and drier seasons. The wetter season spans from December through May, while the drier season covers the remaining six months of the year. Like many cities with a tropical rainforest climate, average temperatures vary little throughout the course of the year, generally hovering around 26.5 degrees Celsius. As one would expect, tropical rainforest is the natural vegetation in and around the city.

Vegetation

The Amazon represents more than half the planet's remaining rainforests and comprises the largest and most species-rich tract of tropical rainforest in the world. Wet tropical forests are the most species-rich biome, and tropical forests in the Americas are consistently more species rich than the wet forests in Africa and Asia.  As the largest tract of tropical rainforest in the Americas, the Amazonian rainforests have unparalleled biodiversity. More than one-third of all species in the world live in the Amazon Rainforest.

Economy

Many valuable products now exported from the Amazon by way of Belém are aluminium, iron ore, and other metals, nuts (chiefly Brazil nuts), pineapples, cassava, jute, wood veneers, and hardwoods. Japanese immigration after the 1930s was an important factor in developing jute and black pepper, notably at Tomé-Açu, just south of Belém, and near Santarém. Marajó Island, the largest fluvial island in the world, which lies just across the Rio Pará from Belém, has some livestock grazing. Electricity is provided by the massive Tucuruí Dam, some 300 km southwest of the city on the Tocantins River.

Demographics

According to the IBGE of 2018, there were 2,491,052 people residing in the Metropolitan Region of Belém. This region is composed by 7 cities: Belém (1,485.732 people), Ananindeua (525,566 people), Marituba (129,321 people), Benevides (61,689 people), Santa Bárbara do Pará (20,704 people), Santa Izabel do Pará (69,746 people), and Castanhal (198,294 people). The last PNAD (National Research for Sample of Domiciles) census revealed the following numbers: 1,379,655 Pardo (Multiracial) people (64.5%), 588,225 White (27.5%), 156,147 Black (7.3%), 14,973 Asian or Amerindian people (0.7%).

According to an autosomal DNA genetic study from 2011, the ancestral composition of the population of Belém is: 68.6% European ancestry, followed by 20.9% Amerindian ancestry and 10.6% African ancestry.

Education 
Portuguese is the official national language, and thus the primary language taught in schools. But English and Spanish are part of the official high school curriculum.

Education institutions
 Universidade Federal do Pará (UFPA);
 Universidade do Estado do Pará (UEPA);
 Federal Rural University of Amazonia (UFRA);
 Universidade da Amazônia (UNAMA);
 Centro de Instrução Almirante Brás de Aguiar (CIABA);
 Centro Universitário do Pará (Cesupa);
 Amazon Valley Academy International School (AVA);
 Escola Superior da Amazônia  (ESAMAZ);
 Instituto Federal de Educação, Ciência e Tecnologia do Pará  (IFPA)

Culture

Círio de Nazaré
On the second Sunday in October, Pará celebrates the largest religious event in Brazil: the procession of the Círio of Nazaré. This tradition started when a farmer and lumberman called Plácido José de Souza found an image of the Virgin and Child on the edge of the Murucutu creek, where the Basilica of Our Lady of Nazareth of Exile stands today. He decided to take the image home. However, the image would mysteriously go back to the place where it was initially found every time he took it home. So Plácido decided to build a small chapel on the edge of the creek. This episode was regarded as miraculous throughout the region. It attracted hundreds of believers to see the image and pay homage to it.

Since then, the Círio has been celebrated as a long procession lasting around five hours, in which thousands of people follow the statue through the streets of Belém. The Círio festival is regarded as the "Christmas of the Amazon" because everyone is involved in the arrangements to receive the saint. In early September, minor celebrations take place as a spiritual preparation for the Círio, with thousands of images scattered all over the capital and neighboring cities.

In time it became necessary to incorporate new elements into the tradition due to the people's desire to honor their patron saint. On the Saturday morning prior to the Círio procession the statue is taken to the square of Ananindeua, a nearby city, to begin a Road Pilgrimage to the Icoaraci pier for a Mass. The river pilgrimage then begins. It was created to honor the "water men" who regard the Virgin of Nazareth as their patron saint. There is a traditional ship contest to award the most originally decorated boat. When the Sacred Image leaves Icoaraci in a Navy Corvette, it is followed by dozens of boats and ships through the waters of Guajará Bay to the pier of Belém, from where it is escorted all the way to the Gentil Bittencourt School. The subsequent candle-lit procession symbolizes the story of the discovery of the Saint and its return to where it was found. The procession follows the Carriage, to which a huge rope is tied, which is carried by the faithful until the procession arrives at the Sé Cathedral.

During the procession, there is a fireworks show, sponsored by the Stevedores' Union, marking the passage of the Saint until its arrival at the Cathedral. At daybreak of the next day, the faithful start to gather at the Old City, believing that this will bring them closer to the Virgin. At 7 o'clock, the archbishop conducts the image to the carriage as bells toll and fireworks explode. The main procession then goes through the streets of the city to the Architectonic Centre of Nazareth, known for its Sanctuary Square. As it arrives at the square, the image is removed from the carriage for the celebration of a Mass and then lifted so that everybody will be blessed by the patron saint of Pará.

The festivities last 15 days, with religious celebrations, like the Children's Círio, and its procession, held two Sundays after the Círio. The Re-Círio marks the end of the celebrations, with a shorter course back to the Gentil Bittencourt chapel.

Convention and Fair Centre of the Amazon
Built in a 23,000-square-metre area, the Hangar Convention and Fair Center of the Amazon has 12 rooms, ticket offices, baggage keeping, press room, and a food court, distributed in two big buildings with a parking lot for 800 vehicles. Genuine Amazonian trees will soon be planted in the outdoor area. With Hangar, Belém joins the market for national conventions that take place in a different city each time, such as the Brazilian Computer Society Congress. National conventions had not been held in the Northern region previously.

Hangar, whose auditorium has room for 2,160 participants, has some of the best technologies available in the world and is the most modern and functional space for events in the country. According to the Brazilian Association of Convention and Fair Centers (ABRACCEF), there are 17,500 events happening on average throughout the 53 main convention and exhibition centres of Brazil. These activities bring together approximately 28 million participants. Belém has great potential for this type of tourism.

Architecture

In many ways, Belém's colonial architecture reflects the seventeenth-century architecture of Lisbon in Portugal which served as the inspiration for the main housing projects of the time, with the frequent use of tile-hung façades. Neoclassical architecture is also present in buildings such as the Theatro da Paz, built in 1874. Many of the buildings at the end of the nineteenth century and early twentieth century also echo French architecture.

Belém began with the narrow streets of the Cidade Velha (Old City), a district which still preserves some structures that the Portuguese colonials built here, places like Forte do Castelo, a fort built to defend the region against French, Dutch and British colonization attempts, and one of the first structures in the capital. The Ver-o-pêso market is the biggest open market in Latin America where you can find everything, from the most exotic fruit, to the scented baths.

Cuisine

The local Amerindian culture makes use of local elements to create the colors and flavors of its cuisine. One such dish, "Cupuaçu", comes from the Cupuaçu tree, found in the Amazonian woods. Cupuaçu is easily identified by its unique smell and sour taste. Its pulp is also extracted to make juices, candies, jellies, liquors, and ice cream. Açaí is a palm tree with a long, thin stem. Açaí, also known as Jussara, is purple in color with a delicious taste. Long prized by the local population, it recently it has also reached the national menu.

Freshwater crab, a traditional local delicacy, is popular. Found only in swamps, its well-tempered meat can be served in different forms: as a shell, the so-called unha (the claws) or toc-toc.  "Maniçoba" is another highlight of local cuisine. Its preparation is time-consuming and its final appearance is quite surprising for those who have never tried it, due to the dark look of the cooked maniva (ground manioc leaves). But this first impression ends quickly, after you taste the dish with its seemingly awkward ingredients. Maniçoba is often served in ceramic dishes, and can be eaten with rice or with manioc flour and capsicum.

Belém has been part of the UNESCO Creative Cities Network in the category of gastronomy since 2015.

World Social Forum
The World Social Forum 2009 took place from January 27 to February 1 in Belém.

Sports 

The three main football teams in Pará are based in Belém: Paysandu, Remo and Tuna Luso. Paysandu based in São Braz, play at the 16200 capacity Estádio da Curuzú, the oldest stadium of Pará state; Remo, based in Travessa Antônio Baena, play at the 17250 capacity Baenão; and Tuna Luso-Brasileira based in Souza play at the much smaller 6500 Estádio Francisco Vasques. The latter stadium is currently the home of Clube Municipal Ananindeua who represent the very large suburb of Ananindeua.

The Estádio Olímpico do Pará is the biggest in the city and hosts 45,000 spectators, the stadium hosts the Grande Premio Brasil de Atletismo, that is part of the IAAF World Challenge as well as Sport Club Belém and the aforementioned teams for large matches.

União Esportiva used to be a relatively successful club based in the city but was disbanded in 1965.

Tourism
Belém has a modern appearance with tree-lined streets, several plazas and public gardens, and many noteworthy buildings. The north's leading educational and cultural centre, it is the seat of a bishopric, and its cathedral (Igreja da Sé, founded in 1917) is one of Brazil's largest. Santo Alexandre, the oldest of Belém's churches, was built in 1616. The Museu (museum) Paraense Emílio Goeldi, the Teatro da Paz (a classical theatre), and the public library and archives are other notable institutions. The Universidade Federal do Pará (1957), a teacher-training school, an agricultural institute, and an institute for research on tropical diseases are also in the city. The Ver-o-Peso (Portuguese: "see the weight") market in the old port centre is a major tourist attraction. The city is also home to a large football stadium, the Estádio Olímpico do Pará.

Utinga State Park

The municipality of Belém contains 99% of the Utinga State Park, created in 1993 to protect the metropolitan area's water supply.
The park provides a space for healthy activities in contact with nature by local people, visitors or tourists.
It is just a few kilometers from the city center.
There are eight trails, all providing direct contact with various species of flora and fauna.
The most popular is the monkey trail, which takes about 40 minutes and goes from Bolonha lake to the visitor center, where other activities are available.
Visitors can also learn about the water treatment plant that supplies Belém.

Amazon Biopark Zoo

A large attractive Bioparque is the Museum of Paleontology and Malacology where visitors can watch a collection of three thousand pieces of exposed shells and mollusks collected from all continents. On site, you will also see paintings with motifs of cabloco Amazon.

Bioparque The Amazon is a private investment, owner Jorge Arthur Aarão Monteiro, authorized and licensed by IBAMA to function as C class zoo, the only category of Pará There are four different species of alligators in a population of thousands of individuals, highlighting açu for alligator, monkeys, anteaters, and the otters, hyacinth macaw, papagaios, tucannos, pacaranas, harpy eagle, among other animals.
Also see the city turistic website here.

Rodrigues Alves Wood–Botanical Garden
Inspired by the Bois de Boulogne Park in Paris, the Rodrigues Alves Wood is a little piece of Amazonia preserved in the middle of the city. Comprising 16 hectares, in the ample Avenida Almirante Barroso, one of the city's busiest thoroughfares, having 2,500 native species, an orchidary, lakes, caverns, waterfalls and even a replica of a mountain. There you can see small animals characteristic to the region, such as squirrel monkeys, agoutis and macaws.

The Estação das Docas Complex
The Estação das Docas Complex reopened the windows of Belém to Guajará Bay. The restoration project covers the area of old warehouses of the Pará Docks Company. Constructed from prefabricated metal structures in England and that were built at the beginning of the 20th century in Belém.

Ver-o-Peso Market
Created in 1688, as a result of the Portuguese deciding to levy a tax for everything entering and leaving Amazonia. Despite resembling a large retailer, the mixture of colours, fragrances and objects is very interesting as well as folkloric.

Medicinal herbs, various regional fruits, arts and crafts, domestic utilities, meats, fish and seasonings and spices can be found there. The Market brings together two thousand stalls and traders in every part and is located near to the old Mercado de Ferro (Iron market), on the quays.

Mosqueiro

Infrastructure

Airports

Belém International Airport (Val de Cans) is the major airport serving the city of Belém. The building design uses plane curves on its roof to permit light to enter its entire large terminal hall.

The architect Sérgio Parada used adopted multiple-use totems integrated with light projectors, a sound system, air conditioning, and public telephones.

Traditionally called Val-de-Cães Airport, it is responsible for increasing tourism in the Amazon region, as well as for the outflow of products and attracting new investments. The passenger terminal is fully air conditioned on two levels and has "futuristic" architecture, designed to take advantage of natural lighting. People with special needs have individualized service with own equipment at specific locations to facilitate their access. The terminal's interior is decorated with plants native to the Amazon region and is enclosed by a source able to imitate the sound of the rains that fall every day in the region.

There also used to exist a smaller Brig. Protásio de Oliveira Airport (Júlio César), also administrated by Infraero, which was used for general aviation, in January, 1st, 2022 it was taken out of service and the area it occupied is going to be turned into a park, its functions were transferred to the main Val-de-Cães airport.

Belém Air Force Base - ALA9, one of their most important bases of the Brazilian Air Force, is located in Belém.

Highways
BR-316 is the major access highway for those coming from the Northeastern Brazil. For visitors from the Southern, Southeastern, and Mid-Eastern Regions, the best route is BR-010, which originates in Brasília in the South, and also PA-150, a route that links Belém to Southern Pará.

Waterways
Belém can be reached by the Tocantins River and Amazonas River and by the Atlantic Ocean.

Railways

The EF-151 railway, known as "Ferrovia Norte-Sul", literally meaning "North-South Railway", is being extended to run until the city of Barcarena, that is about 111 km away by road. When construction is finished, Barcarena will be linked with important cities, like Imperatriz, Porto Nacional, Anápolis and Panorama.

Distances
São Paulo: 
Rio de Janeiro: 
Brasília: 
Manaus: 
Teresina: 
São Luís: 
Santarém, Pará: 
Rio Branco: 
Florianópolis: 
Cuiabá: 
Belo Horizonte:

Notable people

Benedito Nunes - philosopher
Benedito José Nascimento – comic book artist
Beto Gonçalves – footballer
Dira Paes - actress
Dona Onete - singer
Fafá de Belém – singer
Felipa Maria Aranha - leader of the Mola quilombo
Gaby Amarantos - singer
Giovanni Silva de Oliveira – footballer
Giuseppe Antonio Landi - architect
Guilherme Paraense – olympic medalist
Hélio Gracie – martial artist
Ismael Nery - painter
João Amazonas – marxist theoretician
João Clemente Baena Soares - diplomat
Larissa Pacheco - mixed martial artist
Lyoto Machida - mixed martial artist
Paulo Henrique Chagas de Lima – footballer
Priscilla Meirelles – beauty queen
Sócrates – footballer and physician
Leila Pinheiro – singer
Waldemar Henrique – composer
Rosamaria Murtinho - actress
Rossevelt Bala -  heavy metal band vocalist
Victória Pitts - mezzo-soprano

Government

Subdivisions

Based on Municipal Law nº 8.655 of 30 July 2008, the municipality is divided in 8 Administrative Districts and 71 Neightborhoods:

International Relations
Belem has the following partnership cities:

References

External links

 
 
 Website with information, guides and tourist information about Belém (English)
 Website of festivals, events and cultural agenda of the City of Belém (English)

 
Port cities in Brazil
Populated places established in 1616
1616 establishments in the Portuguese Empire
1616 establishments in South America
Municipalities in Pará